KAET (channel 8), known as Arizona PBS, is a PBS member television station in Phoenix, Arizona, United States, owned by Arizona State University and operated by ASU's Walter Cronkite School of Journalism and Mass Communication. KAET's studios are located at the Cronkite School's facility at ASU Downtown Phoenix, and its transmitter is located on South Mountain on the south side of Phoenix. Its signal is relayed across Arizona on a network of 13 translator stations.

History
In late 1959, as it was preparing to build new facilities for itself, Phoenix commercial television station KVAR offered to sell its old transmitter on South Mountain, valued at $150,000, to ASU for $30,000. The offer jumpstarted plans to build an educational television station in Phoenix and prompted the Arizona Board of Regents to authorize expenditures for the transmitter and additional equipment in January 1960.

On November 8, 1960, the Federal Communications Commission granted the construction permit to ASU. Having found that the call letters KASU was already in use at Arkansas State University, the call letters KAET was selected, for "Arizona Educational Television". The station began broadcasting January 30, 1961, with a series of telecourses as well as programming from National Educational Television; the station's first local production was a Spanish 101 course. By 1966, KAET broadcast 50 hours a week of programs. It converted to color, first with network shows, with a grant for a color broadcast chain in 1967; the station's lobbying for color conversion was aided when the staff delivered a color television set to university president G. Homer Durham. In 1973, KAET moved from its original home in the Engineering Center to another location on the Tempe campus, the newly built Stauffer Hall communications building.

Statewide expansion began in 1980 when translators on Mount Francis and Mingus Mountain, followed the next year by another on Mount Elden, were activated. The decade also saw the establishment of Horizon, the station's flagship public affairs show, in 1981; the world's first broadcast of open heart surgery in 1983; and the station's wall-to-wall telecast of the Evan Mecham impeachment hearings in 1988.

In June 1999, KAET was issued a permit to construct digital television facilities on UHF channel 29. KAET-DT went on the air in April 2001 and was licensed on June 12, 2001, becoming the fifth licensed digital television station in the state.

During the late-2000s recession, fundraising efforts at KAET fell behind projections, resulting in two major rounds of layoffs. The first round came in late October 2008, when the station, having missed its fundraising targets by hundreds of thousands of dollars, had to lay off six workers. The second round of layoffs came in April 2009, when 13 workers were laid off. The financial crisis also delayed KAET's move from its longtime home on the Tempe campus to its new headquarters in downtown Phoenix; the move was completed at the end of 2009.

Known for years as "Channel 8", the station began using "Arizona PBS" as a secondary brand in 2005. In 2006, KAET relaunched as "Eight, Arizona PBS" (stylized as "ei8ht" in logos); this brand was dropped in 2015 in favor of simply "Arizona PBS".

Previously under the supervision of the ASU public affairs office, though with a close association with the Cronkite School, operational control of the station was transferred to Cronkite itself in 2014. KAET airs a Cronkite News newscast produced by journalism students on weeknights (along with occasional breaking news coverage), and Cronkite also houses the western bureau of the PBS NewsHour, which opened in 2019.

Programming
KAET produces several of its programs in-house, such as its current events program Arizona Horizon, its Hispanic-focused current events counterpart Horizonte, and its Arizona Collection documentaries about the people, places and history of the state. The Emmy Award-winning Over Arizona, produced in 1995 with KCTS Seattle, is an aerial adventure over Arizona's diverse landscapes and was the first high-definition television program produced by an Arizona broadcast entity.

Technical information

Subchannels
The station's signal is multiplexed:

Analog-to-digital conversion
KAET's digital signal has been on the air since 2001, originally operating on UHF channel 29, and presently carries four subchannels under the Arizona PBS Digital Broadcasting brand. The station shut down its analog signal, over VHF channel 8, on April 29, 2009. The station's digital signal relocated from its pre-transition UHF channel 29 to VHF channel 8.

Translators

References

External links
 Official website

AET
Arizona State University
Television channels and stations established in 1961
PBS member stations
1961 establishments in Arizona